Ali Hamroyev (sometimes spelled Ali Khamrayev in English) (born May 19, 1937) is an Uzbek actor, film director, screenwriter, and film producer. He is best known in the former Soviet Union for his works in the 1960s and 1970s.

To date, Hamroyev has made over 30 documentary and over 20 feature films. His most famous films include Yor-yor (1964), The Seventh Bullet (1972), The Bodyguard (1979), and Vuodillik kelin (1984). Hamroyev has received many honorary titles and awards, including the title Meritorious Artist of Uzbekistan (1969).

Life and work 
Ali Hamroyev was born on May 19, 1937, in Tashkent, then the Uzbek SSR. He graduated from the Gerasimov Institute of Cinematography (VGIK) in 1961. That same year he started working at Uzbekfilm.

Hamroyev is best known in the former Soviet Union for his works in the 1960s and 1970s. He has made over 30 documentary and over 20 feature films throughout his career. Hamroyev is still working today. In 2010, he announced that Jack Nicholson had agreed to portray Timur in his new movie.

Filmography

As director 
 Bolalar haqida kichik hikoyalar (Russian: Маленькие истории о детях, которые...) (Short Stories about Children) (1961)
 Любит — не любит? (Does He/She Love or Not?) (1964)
 Yor-yor (Russian: Где ты, моя Зульфия?) (Yor-Yor) (1964)
 Laylak keldi, yoz boʻldi (Russian: Белые, белые аисты) (The White Storks) (1966)
 Dilorom (1967)
 Qizil qum (Russian: Красные пески) (The Red Sands) (1968)
 Favqulodda komissar (Russian: Чрезвычайный комиссар) (The Extraordinary Commissar) (1970)
 Без страха (Fearless) (1971)
 Yettinchi oʻq (Russian: Седьмая пуля) (The Seventh Bullet) (1972)
 Muxlis (Russian: Поклонник) (The Fan) (1973)
 Inson qushlar ortidan boradi (Russian: Человек уходит за птицами) (The Man is after Birds) (1975)
 Триптих (Triptych) (1978)
 Телохранитель (The Bodyguard) (1979)
 Жаркое лето в Кабуле (A Hot Summer in Kabul) (1983)
 Vuodillik kelin (Russian: Невеста из Вуадиля) (A Bride from Vuodil) (1984)
 Я тебя помню (I Remember You) (1985)
 Сад желаний (The Garden of Desires) (1988)
 Kim jinni? (Russian: Кто сумасшедший?) (Who is Insane?) (1992)
 Bo Ba Bu (1998)
 Место под солнцем (A Place under the Sun) (2004)
 Артисты (The Artists) (2007)

As actor 
 Место под солнцем (A Place under the Sun) (2004)

As screenwriter 
 Laylak keldi, yoz boʻldi (Russian: Белые, белые аисты) (The White Storks) (1966)
 Dilorom (1967)
 Favqulodda komissar (Russian: Чрезвычайный комиссар) (The Extraordinary Commissar) (1970)
 Без страха (Fearless) (1971)
 Эшмат — добрый ангел (Eshmat — A Kind Angel) (1979) (short film)
 Телохранитель (The Bodyguard) (1979)
 Стрелять сгоряча не стоит (Shooting Rashly is not Worth It) (1983)
 Vuodillik kelin (Russian: Невеста из Вуадиля) (A Bride from Vuodil) (1984)
 Я тебя помню (I Remember You) (1985)
 Kim jinni? (Russian: Кто сумасшедший?) (Who is Insane?) (1992)
 Bo Ba Bu (1998)

Awards 
Hamroyev has received many honorary titles and awards throughout his career, including the title Meritorious Artist of the Uzbek SSR (1969). In 1971, he received the State Hamza Prize.

References

External links
 

1937 births
Uzbeks
Living people
Mass media people from Tashkent
Ostern films
Soviet film directors
Soviet screenwriters
Male screenwriters
Uzbekistani screenwriters
Uzbekistani film directors
Uzbekistani film producers
Uzbekistani male film actors
21st-century Uzbekistani male actors
Academicians of the National Academy of Motion Picture Arts and Sciences of Russia
Gerasimov Institute of Cinematography alumni